In mathematics, a pre-measure is a set function that is, in some sense, a precursor to a bona fide measure on a given space. Indeed, one of the fundamental theorems in measure theory states that a pre-measure can be extended to a measure.

Definition

Let  be a ring of subsets (closed under union and relative complement) of a fixed set  and let  be a set function.  is called a pre-measure if 

and, for every countable (or finite) sequence  of pairwise disjoint sets whose union lies in 

The second property is called -additivity.

Thus, what is missing for a pre-measure to be a measure is that it is not necessarily defined on a sigma-algebra (or a sigma-ring).

Carathéodory's extension theorem

It turns out that pre-measures give rise quite naturally to outer measures, which are defined for all subsets of the space   More precisely, if  is a pre-measure defined on a ring of subsets  of the space  then the set function  defined by

The infimum of the empty set is taken to be 

(Note that there is some variation in the terminology used in the literature.  For example, Rogers (1998) uses "measure" where this article uses the term "outer measure".  Outer measures are not, in general, measures, since they may fail to be -additive.)

See also

References

  
   (See section 1.2.)
 

Measures (measure theory)